Cemre Fere (born 8 February 1994) is a Turkish badminton player. She won the women's singles title at the 2017 Turkish National Championships, and have won 16 international title in the singles and doubles events.

Achievements

BWF International Challenge/Series (16 titles, 5 runners-up) 
Women's singles

Women's doubles

  BWF International Challenge tournament
  BWF International Series tournament
  BWF Future Series tournament

References

External links 
 

Living people
1994 births
People from Osmangazi
Sportspeople from Bursa
Turkish female badminton players
21st-century Turkish sportswomen